Bengt Evert Andersson (born 11 August 1966) is a Swedish football coach and former professional player.

Having most prominently represented IFK Göteborg, Örgryte IS and IK Brage during a career spanning twenty-three years, Andersson initially retired from playing in 2007. However, he has since made several returns to the game, most recently joining Särö IK, at the age of 50, in 2016.

Club career
Born in Kungsbacka, Andersson began his career in his native Sweden with GAIS, Brage and Örgryte, where he gained a reputation as a good penalty taker in spite of being a goalkeeper. After two seasons with Spanish club Tenerife, with whom he reached the UEFA Cup semi-finals in 1997, Andersson joined Göteborg, where he was the club's first choice goalkeeper until the 2008 season. There was some speculation that he would retire after the 2006 season, but Andersson himself stated in the official IFK magazine that he would continue for at least three more seasons. He made 194 straight appearances in the Swedish top flight, the seventh most all time. He is also one of the oldest players to ever have played in the Allsvenskan.

He finally won the Swedish league title with Göteborg, becoming a Swedish champion for the first time at the age of 41. He was the oldest footballer to ever win the Allsvenskan.

In the summer of 2008 he joined Norwegian second-tier side Moss on loan from Tölö IF.

Andersson briefly retired after the 2008 season, but in May 2009 he made his comeback with his former club Örgryte, signing a three-month contract with a possible extension, after two of Örgryte's goalkeepers became injured.

On 9 November 2012, Andersson officially announced he would start a career as a coach and that he had been appointed head coach of Swedish Division 3 club Kållered SK.

On 8 August 2013, he made a brief comeback as third-choice goalkeeper for Örgryte IS.

On 18 June 2014, he was sacked as Kållered SK coach.

International career
Andersson made his debut for Sweden on 4 June 1995 in a 0–1 loss against Brazil at the Villa Park in Birmingham during the Umbro Cup. He was a stand-by player in the 2006 FIFA World Cup.

References

External links
 
 
  (archive 1, archive 2)
 Bengt Andersson at IFK Göteborg 
 Bolletinen 

1966 births
Living people
People from Kungsbacka
Association football goalkeepers
CD Tenerife players
IFK Göteborg players
La Liga players
Allsvenskan players
Moss FK players
Sweden international footballers
Expatriate footballers in Spain
Expatriate footballers in Norway
Swedish expatriate sportspeople in Norway
Swedish expatriate sportspeople in Spain
Swedish expatriate footballers
Swedish footballers
Örgryte IS players
GAIS players
Sportspeople from Halland County